Yvonne Cavallé Reimers (born May 22, 1992) is a Spanish tennis player.

Cavallé Reimers has career-high WTA rankings of 266 in singles and world No. 216 in doubles. In her career, she has won seven singles titles and 24 doubles titles on the ITF Women's Circuit.

Cavallé Reimers made her WTA Tour main-draw debut at the 2022 Morocco Open when she received entry into the doubles draw, partnering Irene Burillo Escorihuela.

Grand Slam performance

Singles

ITF Circuit finals

Singles: 21 (7 titles, 14 runner-ups)

Doubles: 53 (24 titles, 29 runner-ups)

References

External links
 
 

1992 births
Living people
Spanish female tennis players
Sportspeople from Palma de Mallorca